Arnold Chernushevich (15 January 1933 – 2 September 1991) was a Soviet Olympic fencer. He won a bronze medal in the team épée event at the 1960 Summer Olympics.

References

1933 births
1991 deaths
Belarusian male épée fencers
Soviet male épée fencers
Olympic fencers of the Soviet Union
Fencers at the 1956 Summer Olympics
Fencers at the 1960 Summer Olympics
Olympic bronze medalists for the Soviet Union
Olympic medalists in fencing
Medalists at the 1960 Summer Olympics